Ashfield Boys' High School is a secondary school in Belfast.

Notable alumni 
 David McCreery - Professional footballer, played for Northern Ireland, QPR, Manchester United and Newcastle United.
Gary Moore - World-Class Guitarist - Skid Row, Thin Lizzy and Colosseum II
Sammy McILroy - Professional footballer and manager, played for Northern Ireland, Manchester United and Stoke City

References

External links
 Ashfield Boys' High School website

Secondary schools in Belfast